24 is an Indian Hindi-language action thriller television series which aired on Colors TV, based on the American series of the same name. It aired from 4 October 2013 through 21 December 2013. It was written by Rensil D'Silva, Bhavani Iyer, directed by Abhinay Deo and produced by Ramesh Deo Productions. Season 2 aired from 23 July 2016 and completed its run on 9 October 2016.

The Hindi version of 24 is the first adaptation of the show; the India rights were acquired from Fox and 24 producer Howard Gordon by the production company of Anil Kapoor, who also plays the lead role in the adaptation. In November 2011, Kapoor's production house signed a  100 crore ($20 million at the time) deal to adapt the series. The show is set in Mumbai with the main set of the Anti-Terrorist Unit (ATU) being a replica of the one in the original series. Bollywood actors Anupam Kher and Shabana Azmi both have cameo performances in the show.

The season is directed by Abhinay Deo and Rensil D'Silva, written by Rensil D'Silva and Bhavani Iyer and is supervised by Manisha Sharma. The second season aired in  July 2016 to October 2016.

Plot

Season 1
The season focuses on ATU Chief Jai Singh Rathore (Anil Kapoor), who is torn between saving his family and the entire nation from a major terrorist attack. With assassins and attackers on the loose, it is upto Jai to save the country's Prime Minister-elect candidate Aditya Singhania (Neil Bhoopalam).

Season 2
Jai gets a terror mastermind Roshan Sherchan (Ashish Vidyarthi) arrested along with accomplice Shivani Malik (Sakshi Tanwar). But Roshan's brother Haroon Sherchan (Sikander Kher) threatens to infect Mumbai with a virus that can put everyone's life at risk. While members of the Anti Terrorism Unit (including Shivani Malik) are trying their best to solve the case, Jai Rathod, unbeknownst to them, is hatching a plan to free Roshan. Jai has drawn further ire from his son for being romantically involved with a new woman Maya (Surveen Chawla). Maya also has a connection to the terrorist brothers and is in a relationship with Haroon.

Production
Kapoor, who had previously featured in the American version of the 24 series playing President Omar Hassan, bought the official rights of 24 in November 2011. The show aired in Hindi and was also dubbed in various regional languages. India is the first country outside of the US to get rights to adapt the show. "We hope this will pave the way for many more local versions of this brilliant series in other international territories," Fox International Television president Marion Edwards said in an email reply to ET. Kiefer Sutherland, who starred in the original show has shown interest in acting in the Hindi version.

Colors channel bought the broadcast rights in a deal estimated at Rs 150 crore.  Kapoor holds the rights of the 192 episodes for a period of four years extendable to another ten.

The first season featured the Tata Safari Storme as presenting sponsor, whereas the second season featured the Maruti Suzuki S-Cross. Both cars were advertised prominently in the show.

On 21 October 2013, Kapoor launched Tata Safari Storm presents 24 – The Game, a 3D game in which players participate as ATU Chief Jai Singh Rathod, portrayed on-screen by Kapoor.

The second season of the series also known as Day 2, commenced airing on 23 July 2016. The show is written by Rensil D'Silva, Niranjan Iyengar and Priya Pinto, directed by Abhinay Deo. began shooting in February 2016. Sakshi Tanwar, Surveen Chawla, Sikander Kher, Madhurima Tuli and Ashish Vidyarthi were announced as new main cast members. As with the original show, the plot concerns a mission to save the country from a tragedy, and later an attempt to implicate the conspirators responsible for it. Season 2 of 24 is loosely based on the third season of the original series, while borrowing some story elements from the second season.

Cast

Main
 Anil Kapoor (season 1–2) as Jai Singh Rathod, a character based on Jack Bauer, a man with an army background who is torn between loyalty to his family and to his country, India.
 Tisca Chopra (season 1) as Trisha Rathod, Jai's wife, based on Teri Bauer
 Mandira Bedi (season 1) as Nikita Rai, a government agent at ATU based on the character Nina Myers.
 Sapna Pabbi (season 1–2) as Kiran Jai Singh Rathod, Jai and Trisha's teenage daughter, the character of Kim Bauer in the original series.
 Adhish Khanna (season 1) as Veer Singh Rathod, Jai and Trisha's son.
 Akshay Ajit Singh (season 2) as Veer Singh Rathod, Replaced Khanna is season 2.
 Neil Bhoopalam (season 1–2) as Aditya Singhania, a Prime-Ministerial candidate and a youth icon whose life is in danger, based on the character President David Palmer of the original show.
 Madhurima Tuli (season 2) as Dr. Devyani Bhowmick, Aditya's girlfriend. Inspired from character Dr. Anne Packard from original show.
 Sakshi Tanwar (season 2) as Shibani Malik.

Recurring
 Adhir Bhatt (season 1) as Tejpal Singh Sandhu, a government agent at ATU, based on the character Tony Almeida of the original show.
 Shivani Tanksale (season 1) as Divya Singhania Maurya, sister of Aditya and wife of Vikrant, loosely based on Nicole Palmer.
 Anita Raj (season 1–2) as Naina Singhania, Aditya and Divya's mother, inspired from the character Sherry Palmer of original show.
 Rahul Singh (season 1). as Vikrant Maurya, Divya's husband.
 Raaghav Chanana (season 1–2) as Prithvi Singhania, Aditya's cousin and Chief of Staff, inspired from the characters Wayne Palmer and Mike Novick from the original show.
 Pooja Ruparel (season 1) as Pooja Bharadwaj, an aide to the minister.
 Yuri Suri (season 1) as Mahinder Gill, a senior Research and Analysis Wing officer who takes control of the ATU, based on George Mason.
 Shivkumar Subramaniam (season 1) as Kamaljit Sood, a Senior Research and Analysis Wing (RAW) officer comes to question Jai, inspired from Ryan Chappelle.
 Nissar Khan (season 1) as Murad Ali.
 Suchitra Pillai (season 1) as Mehek Ahuja, a TV Journalist and Vikrant's lover.
 Shahnawaz Pradhan (season 1) as KK, inspired by campaign manager Carl Webb.
 Aradhana Jagota (season 1) as Jhanvi Abhay Gupta, Kiran's friend based on Janet York.
 Kiran Srinivas (season 1) as Dev.
 Priyanshu Jora (season 1) as Rohit.
 Nikunj Malik (season 1) as Simran, the girl whom Veer helps.
 Gurpreet Saini (season 1–2) as Mihir, based on the character Milo Pressman in the original series.
 Kishor Kadam (season 1) as Ravinder, LTFE Chief, based on the character Victor Drazen of the original show.
 Rajeev Siddhartha (season 1) as Bala Ravinder, Ravinder's son, inspired from Alexis Drazen.
 Dibyendu Bhattacharya (season 1) as Raja, Ravinder's right-hand man, inspired from Andre Drazen.
 Ankur Vikal (season 1) as Yakub Sayeed, terrorist leader, based on Ira Gaines.
 Ajinkya Deo (season 1) as Kartik Chandrashekhar / Abhay Gupta, Jhanvi's Fake father.
 Rajat Kaul (season 1) as Max Ferraro, a free line photographer.
 Nikkitasha Marwaha (Season 1–2) as Mehr, an assassin based on the character Mandy from the original show.
 Rahul Khanna (season 1) as Tarun Khosla, a young rich businessman.
 Richa Chadda (season 1) as Sapna, a cameo.
 Bikramjeet Kanwarpal (season 1) as Agent Pradhan.
 Shweta Pandit (season 1)
 Vikas Shrivastav as Shinde (season 2)
 Sikander Kher (season 2) as Haroon Sherchan, younger brother of Roshan Sherchan who wants his brother to be out of prison based on Hector Salazar.
 Ashish Vidyarthi (season 2) as Roshan Sherchan, a narcoterrorist caught by Jai, based on Ramon Salazar
 Surveen Chawla (season 2) as Maya, based on Claudia Hernandez
 Harsh Chhaya (season 2) as Siddharth Saigal, Intelligence Bureau Head
 Sumit Kaul (season 2) as Gyan Thakkar, thought at one point to be an enemy mole, he was revealed to have been working with Jai to coordinate an elaborate sting operation in which Jai would infiltrate the Sherchan's operation and gain their trust by breaking Roshan out of prison, based on Gael Ortega.
 Karanvir Sharma (season 2) as Raj Singh Bhakta
 Sudhanshu Pandey (season 2) as Vedant Acharya original cast as Tony Almeida
 Naveen Polishetty (season 2) as Kush Sawant, based on Kyle Singer
 Gunjan Malhotra (season 2) as Zaara
 Akash Khurana (season 2) as Bhisham Bhowmick
 Prerna Wanvari (season 2)
 Angad Bedi (season 2) as Dhruv Awasthi, based on Michael Amador
 Pallavi Patil (season 2) as Mitali
 Sharad Ponkshe (Season 2) as Amar Mane-Shinde, based on Alan Milliken
 Amruta Khanvilkar (season 2) as Antara Mane-Shinde, based on Julia Milliken
 Ritu Shivpuri (season 2) as Dr. Sunny Mehta
 Rajesh Khera (season 2) as Sudeep
 Manasi Rachh (season 2) as Maddy
 Nagesh Bhonsle (season 2) as Marathe
 Faezeh Jalali (season 2) as Jia

Guest
 Anupam Kher (season 1) as Wasim Khan, a Research and Analysis Wing officer based on Richard Walsh
 Shabana Azmi (season 1–2) as Abhilasha Grewal, based on the character Alberta Green.
 Ronit Roy (season 2) as Roy

Episodes

Reception

Season 1
An article in the UK newspaper The Independent stated that it was one of the most expensive TV shows ever produced in India and the first to have a major Bollywood star in the lead.
The Gulf News praised its production values and writing.

Rediff awarded the show 3.5/5 stars and stated that "The plotting: Two sisters, a man who's had a plastic surgery, a vicious boss, an airplane bombing, the sinister face of 24. What doesn't work? The dialogues. They're clunky, contrived, filmi and, at times, little more than a tacky translation. And this shortcoming ruins some potentially strong scenes or disconnects from the steadily brewing tension. While somewhat underwhelmed by the debut episode, I was hooked to the fast-paced, unflinchingly fierce (chopped finger, et al.), action-packed momentum of the second. 24'''s premise is such, every episode inches closer to a disclosure. It may not have the finish of the original but when you look at the bigger picture, Anil Kapoor's new show is a step in a desperately needed direction."The Telegraph'' stated  "... a big thumbs up to its well-chosen cast. Every actor fits perfectly into his or her role, with a special mention for Mandira Bedi's Nikita, Neil Bhoopalam's Aditya and Tisca Chopra's Trisha."

Season 2
Anil Kapoor, who was back with Season 2 of 24, received positive feedback from the viewers for his fresh outing. The actor was grateful for the critical acclaim he has been getting and makes sure he replies to every tweet that mentions him or 24. Critics praised Anil Kapoor, Sikander Kher and Ashish Vidyarthi for their acting skills. Parmita Uniyal of India Today stated "It's dark, it's uncomfortable, it will leave you asking for more".

References

External links
 
 

Indian action television series
Indian crime television series
Detective television series
2013 Indian television series debuts
Television shows set in Mumbai
24 (TV series)
Espionage television series
Serial drama television series
Indian political television series
Terrorism in television
Colors TV original programming
Indian television series based on American television series
2016 Indian television seasons
Sri Lankan Civil War in popular culture
Indian Armed Forces in fiction
Research and Analysis Wing in fiction
Television series about viral outbreaks
Television series by 20th Century Fox Television
Indian Peace Keeping Force